The following outline is provided as an overview of and topical guide to tropical cyclones:

Tropical cyclone – storm system characterized by a large low-pressure center and numerous thunderstorms that produce strong winds and heavy rain. Tropical cyclones strengthen when water evaporated from the ocean is released as the saturated air rises, resulting in condensation of water vapor contained in the moist air. They are fueled by a different heat mechanism than other cyclonic windstorms such as nor'easters, European windstorms, and polar lows. The characteristic that separates tropical cyclones from other cyclonic systems is that at any height in the atmosphere, the center of a tropical cyclone will be warmer than its surroundings; a phenomenon called "warm core" storm systems.

Nature of tropical cyclones

Tropical cyclones can be described as all of the following:
 Storm – disturbed state of an environment or astronomical body's atmosphere especially affecting its surface, and strongly implying severe weather. It may be marked by significant disruptions to normal conditions such as strong wind, hail, thunder and lightning (a thunderstorm), heavy precipitation (snowstorm, rainstorm), heavy freezing rain (ice storm), strong winds (tropical cyclone, windstorm), or wind transporting some substance through the atmosphere such as sand or debris.
 Natural disaster – major adverse event resulting from natural processes of the Earth; examples include floods, volcanic eruptions, earthquakes, tsunamis, and other geologic processes. A natural disaster can cause loss of life or property damage, and typically leaves some economic damage in its wake, the severity of which depends on the affected population's resilience, or ability to recover.

Types of tropical cyclones

Tropical cyclone –
Subtropical cyclone –
Extratropical cyclone (Can be a stage in a Tropical Cyclones life at the beginning or end but not a Tropical Cyclone) –
Post-tropical cyclone (Again, this is a stage in the life of tropical cyclones, albeit not technically tropical anymore.) –
Pacific hurricane –
North Atlantic hurricane –
Pacific typhoon –
Mediterranean tropical cyclone –
Annular hurricane –
Cape Verde-type hurricane –
Tropical wave –

Tropical cyclone observations

 Tropical cyclone scales –
Saffir-Simpson Hurricane Scale –
Accumulated cyclone energy –
Hurricane Severity Index –
Carvill Hurricane Index –
Dvorak technique –
 Tropical cyclone naming –

Forecasting
Regional Specialized Meteorological Centre –
Canadian Hurricane Centre –
Central Pacific Hurricane Center –
Eastern Pacific Hurricane Center –
Joint Typhoon Warning Center –
Joint Typhoon Warning Center –
Tropical Cyclone Formation Alert –
Tropical cyclone forecast model –
Tropical cyclone forecasting –
Tropical cyclone rainfall forecasting –
Tropical cyclone track forecasting –
Tropical cyclone warnings and watches –

Tropical cyclone history

Tropical cyclone seasons
Atlantic hurricane season
Pacific hurricane season
Pacific typhoon season
North Indian Ocean tropical cyclone season
South-West Indian Ocean tropical cyclone season
Australian region tropical cyclone season
South Pacific tropical cyclone season
South Atlantic tropical cyclone

Specific tropical cyclones 

 List of tropical cyclones
 Lists of tropical cyclone names
 List of named tropical cyclones
 List of unnamed tropical cyclones
 List of historic tropical cyclone names
 List of retired tropical cyclone names
 List of tropical cyclone records
 List of wettest tropical cyclones by country
 List of wettest tropical cyclones in the United States
 List of most intense tropical cyclones
 List of Atlantic hurricanes
 List of Category 4 Atlantic hurricanes
 List of Category 5 Atlantic hurricanes
 List of costliest Atlantic hurricanes
 List of deadliest Atlantic hurricanes
 List of Atlantic hurricane records
 List of retired Atlantic hurricane names
 List of off-season Atlantic hurricanes
 List of Atlantic–Pacific crossover hurricanes
 List of Pacific hurricanes
 List of retired Pacific hurricane names
 List of retired Pacific typhoon names (JMA)
 List of Category 5 Pacific hurricanes

See also

Index of meteorology articles
Outline of meteorology

References

External links

Regional Specialized Meteorological Centres
 US National Hurricane Center – North Atlantic, Eastern Pacific
 Central Pacific Hurricane Center  – Central Pacific
 Japan Meteorological Agency – NW Pacific
 India Meteorological Department – Bay of Bengal and the Arabian Sea
 Japan Meteorological Agency – NW Pacific
 Météo-France – La Reunion – South Indian Ocean from 30°E to 90°E
 Fiji Meteorological Service – South Pacific west of 160°E, north of 25° S

Tropical Cyclone Warning Centers
 Indonesian Meteorological Department – South Indian Ocean from 90°E to 125°E, north of 10°S
 Australian Bureau of Meteorology (TCWC's Perth, Darwin & Brisbane). – South Indian Ocean & South Pacific Ocean from 90°E to 160°E, south of 10°S
 Meteorological Service of New Zealand Limited – South Pacific west of 160°E, south of 25°S

Tropical cyclone
Tropical cyclone
Outline